Mount Lookout, Ohio is one of the Eastern neighborhoods of Cincinnati, just northwest of Linwood and overlooking the Ohio River valley. 

The Mount Lookout Observatory moved to the neighborhood in 1873. The population was 5,173 at the 2020 census.

Mount Lookout is considered by Hamilton County, Ohio as home to Alms Park as well as Ault Park, although the nearby neighborhood of Hyde Park also considers Ault Park as part of their community. The area contains a neighborhood swim club named Mt. Lookout Swim and Tennis Club.  Kilgour School, Cardinal Pacelli School and St. Ursula Villa School are the only schools located within the community.

References

External links
Mt. Lookout Community Council
Mt. Lookout Observatory
Mt. Lookout Community Overview

Neighborhoods in Cincinnati